Mauseidvåg or Mauseidvågen is a village in Sula Municipality in Møre og Romsdal county, Norway. The European route E39 highway runs just east of the village too.

References

Villages in Møre og Romsdal
Sula, Møre og Romsdal